Gustavo Alessandri Valdés (30 April 1929 – 18 July 2017) was a Chilean politician and lawyer. He was born in Santiago de Chile. He served as Mayor of Central Commune of Santiago de Chile from 1987 through 1989. He served as MP from 1961 through 1965, again from 1969 through 1971, and once more from 1998 to 2002. He was a member of the National Renewal Party from 1987 until his death in 2017.

Alessandri Valdés died on 18 July 2017 in Santiago de Chile from natural causes at the age of 88.

References

External links
 Biography of Gustavo Alessandri Valdés 

1929 births
2017 deaths
Politicians from Santiago
Gustavo
Chilean people of Italian descent
Liberal Party (Chile, 1849) politicians
National Party (Chile, 1966) politicians
Movimiento de Unión Nacional politicians
National Renewal (Chile) politicians
Deputies of the XLIV Legislative Period of the National Congress of Chile
Deputies of the XLVI Legislative Period of the National Congress of Chile
Deputies of the XLVII Legislative Period of the National Congress of Chile
Deputies of the L Legislative Period of the National Congress of Chile
Mayors of Santiago
20th-century Chilean lawyers
Pontifical Catholic University of Chile alumni